Ensley M. Llewellyn (1905–1989) was a United States military officer credited for reestablishing Stars and Stripes when it resumed publication in 1942, following a hiatus after World War I. He later served as adjutant general of the Washington National Guard.

References

1905 births
1989 deaths
Washington National Guard personnel
United States Army personnel of World War II